The Serenade for orchestra in D major, K. 250 (248b), popularly known as the Haffner Serenade, is a serenade by Wolfgang Amadeus Mozart named for the Haffner family. Mozart's friend and contemporary  commissioned the serenade to be used in the course of the festivities before the wedding of his sister Marie Elisabeth Haffner and her intended, Franz Xaver Spaeth. The Serenade was first played on 21 July 1776, on the eve of the wedding. It is in eight movements:

I.   Allegro maestoso - Allegro molto  
II.   Andante   
III.  Menuetto  
IV.   Rondeau: Allegro   
V.    Menuetto galante   
VI.   Andante
VII.  Menuetto 
VIII. Adagio - Allegro assai

The second, third and fourth movements feature prominent violin solos.  Indeed, the rondeau (the fourth movement) has been arranged for solo violin and used as a popular virtuoso piece.

It is assumed that the Marcia K. 249 was intended as entrance and exit music together with this Serenade.

A typical performance lasts approximately 55 minutes.

See also

Haffner Symphony, K. 385, another celebrated piece commissioned by Haffner

External links
 
Program notes on the Haffner Serenade for its performance by the New York Philharmonic

Serenade 07
Compositions in D major
1776 compositions